Amasaman is one of the constituencies represented in the Parliament of Ghana. It elects one Member of Parliament (MP) by the first past the post system of election. Amasaman is located in the Ga West District of the Greater Accra Region of Ghana.

Boundaries
Amasaman is located in the Ga West District of the Greater Accra Region of Ghana.

Members of Parliament

Hospitals 

 Ga West Municipal Hospital.

Schools

See also
List of Ghana Parliament constituencies

References 

Parliamentary constituencies in the Greater Accra Region